Hannah Azieb Pool (born 1974) is a British–Eritrean writer and journalist. She was born near the town of Keren in Eritrea during the war for independence from Ethiopia. She is a former staff writer for The Guardian newspaper, and writes regularly for national and international media. She is a patron of the SI Leeds Literary Prize for unpublished fiction by Black and Asian women in the UK.

Biography

Early life and education 
At the age of six months, Pool was adopted by a British scholar working in Sudan. At first she was raised in Khartoum and then Norway, before finally settling in Manchester, England. She grew up believing that her genetic parents had died shortly after her birth. She was educated at Liverpool University, where she studied Sociology.

Career 
After leaving university, Pool became a journalist on the Manchester Evening News and has written extensively for The Guardian newspaper, where for several years she wrote the fashion column "The New Black". However, at the age of 19 she had received a letter informing her that her genetic father and siblings were alive in Eritrea. Her memoir, My Fathers' Daughter: A story of family and belonging, was published in 2005 and is an account of the journey she made back to Eritrea, aged 29, and her encounters with her family.

Pool was a Senior Programmer of Contemporary Culture at the Southbank Centre, London. In February 2019 she took up a new appointment as the Artistic Director/CEO at the Bernie Grant Arts Centre in Tottenham. She is a contributor to the 2019 anthology New Daughters of Africa, edited by Margaret Busby.

Bibliography 
 My Fathers' Daughter, London: Hamish Hamilton Ltd, 2005. . 
 Fashion Cities Africa (editor), University of Chicago Press, 2016.

References

External links
 Official website.
 Talking TEDs, Arise magazine, video.

1974 births
Living people
Alumni of the University of Liverpool
Black British women writers
British women journalists
English people of Eritrean descent
Eritrean women journalists
Eritrean women writers
People from Keren, Eritrea
The Guardian people